Fawkner Soccer Club is an Australian soccer club from Fawkner, a suburb of Melbourne, Victoria. The club was formed in 1967 by local Italian Australians after Fawkner SC separated from Fawkner Blues now known as Manningham United FC. After being granted full ownership of CB Smith Reserve the re-branded Fawkner Soccer Club fielded their rebuilt senior side in 2012. In 2015, Fawnker were crowned champions of the State League Division 4 North, earning promotion to the State League Division 3 North-West.

Honours
Men's State League Division 4 North Champions 2015
Men's State League Division 5 North Runners Up 2013

Individual Honours
Men's State League 5 North Best & Fairest
 2013 – Vincenzo Ierardo

References

External links
Official Site
Fawkner SC Teams
Facebook Page
Football Federation Victoria Official website

Victorian Premier League teams
Association football clubs established in 1965
Soccer clubs in Melbourne
Victorian State League teams
1965 establishments in Australia
Italian-Australian culture in Melbourne
Italian-Australian backed sports clubs of Victoria
Sport in the City of Merri-bek